Gordon L. Moore III (born April 6, 1963) is an associate justice of the Minnesota Supreme Court. He was a judge of the Minnesota Fifth District Court in Nobles County from 2012 to 2020.

Early life and education 
Moore grew up in Rochester and graduated from Mayo High School. He lived in Northfield and Mankato before moving to Worthington to raise a family in 1995. He received a Bachelor of Arts from Carleton College in 1985 and his Juris Doctor, with honors, from the University of Iowa College of Law in 1988.

Legal career 
Moore was an associate attorney with the Worthington law office of Von Holtum, Malters & Shepherd, and served as Worthington's assistant city attorney. Before becoming Nobles County attorney, he served as a special assistant and assistant attorney general under Attorney General of Minnesota Skip Humphrey and was an associate and assistant city attorney in Worthington.

State judicial service 
On January 18, 2012, Governor Mark Dayton appointed Moore to the Minnesota Fifth Judicial District Court to the seat vacated by Judge Jeffrey L. Flynn, who retired. He was sworn in on March 1, 2012.

Appointment to Minnesota Supreme Court 
Moore was one of four candidates considered by Governor Tim Walz, along with Court of Appeals Judges Diane Bratvold and Jeffrey Bryan, and Chief Deputy Attorney General John Keller. On May 15, 2020, Walz appointed Moore to the Minnesota Supreme Court. He filled the vacancy left by the retirement of Justice David Lillehaug.

References

External links 
Minnesota Judicial Branch directory web page

1963 births
Living people
People from Rochester, Minnesota
20th-century American lawyers
21st-century American judges
21st-century American lawyers
Carleton College alumni
Minnesota lawyers
Minnesota state court judges
Justices of the Minnesota Supreme Court
University of Iowa College of Law alumni